Merle David Hay (July 20, 1896 – November 3, 1917) was the first Iowa serviceman and perhaps the first American serviceman to die in World War I, along with Corporal James Bethel Gresham of Evansville, Indiana and Thomas Enright of Pittsburgh, Pennsylvania.

Early life 

Merle Hay was born on a Carroll County, Iowa farm to Harvey and Carrie Hay. He was the oldest of 3 children.   In 1909, the family moved to another farm near Glidden. Before his service with the United States Army, he was a farm implement mechanic.

World War I service 

When the United States entered the First World War,  Hay was young enough to avoid being drafted.  With his father's blessing,  he voluntarily enlisted on May 9, 1917.   He was among 8 men from Glidden who enlisted that day.  They were first shipped to Fort Logan, Colorado, then to Fort Bliss in El Paso, Texas. He was assigned to the 16th Infantry Regiment. On 26 June 1917, the regiment disembarked the troop ships in St. Nazaire, France, as part of the 1st Infantry Division. By November 1917, he was assigned to Company F along with Corporal James Bethel Gresham and Private Thomas Enright. They  were posted in the trenches near the French village of Artois.  In the early morning of 3 November 1917,  the Imperial German Army attacked.  After an hour of fighting, Hay, along with Corporal Gresham, and Private Enright were the first three casualties of the American Expeditionary Force.

Two days later, on 5 Nov 1917, Enright, Gresham, and Hay were buried near the battlefield where they had died. An inscription marked their graves: "Here lie the first soldiers of the illustrious Republic of the United States who fell on French soil for justice and liberty."  Their bodies were eventually returned to their families and reburied in the United States.   Hay was then re-interred in July 1921 in West Lawn Cemetery in his home town of Glidden, Iowa. The West Lawn Cemetery was later renamed the Merle Hay Memorial Cemetery. An 8-foot monument commissioned by the Iowa Legislature marks his gravesite.

Shortly after Hay's death, the highway running from the west edge of Des Moines to Camp Dodge was renamed Merle Hay Road. A memorial boulder was placed along Merle Hay Road in 1923 and remains up today amidst the commercial development along the road. Merle Hay Mall in Des Moines was also named for Hay; the local Kiwanis club placed a memorial plaque near the entrance to the mall's Sears store in 1979.

The first American military casualty in World War II was also an Iowa native.  Andrew, Iowa, native Robert M. Losey, a military attache, was killed on April 21, 1940, during a German bombardment of Dombås, Norway. Captain Losey had been attempting to complete the evacuation of the American diplomatic delegation from Norway to Sweden in the wake of the German invasion.

Family

Hay's mother collapsed upon hearing of his death but in an interview two days after Hay's father, D. Hay, said that "I am proud of my boy if he has given up his life for his country." He was survived by a younger brother Basil, eighteen, and a fourteen-year-old sister Opel.

See also 

First killed in WWI
Albert Mayer (soldier), the first Imperial German Army soldier killed, 1914
Jules Andre Peugeot, the first French Army soldier killed, 1914
John Parr, the first British Army soldier killed, 1914
Thomas Enright, one of the first three American Army soldiers killed, 1917
Merle David Hay, one of the first three American Army soldiers killed, 1917
James Bethel Gresham, one of the first three American Army soldiers killed, 1917
Last killed in WWI
George Edwin Ellison, the last British Army soldier killed in World War I, at 9:30 a.m. 11 November
Augustin Trébuchon, last French soldier killed, at 10:45 a.m. 11 November
George Lawrence Price, last Commonwealth soldier killed in World War I, 10:58 a.m. 11 November.
Henry Gunther, last soldier killed in World War I, at 10:59 a.m. 11 November.

Bibliography
Notes

References

External links
 

1896 births
1917 deaths
United States Army personnel of World War I
People from Carroll County, Iowa
United States Army soldiers
American military personnel killed in World War I